Malik Ghulam Yasin Chhina (1941–2008) was a Pakistani Muslim lawyer and social worker. He served as a Bhakkar Court chairman Election Board of Bhakkar Court in the Punjab bar court for nearly his whole life.

References 

1941 births
2008 deaths
20th-century Pakistani lawyers